Ahlgrens was a Swedish confectionery company. It was founded by Fredrik Ahlgren in the town of Gävle in 1885 as a store for paint and wallpaper, a business which was later extended to the production and sale of various types of chemicals, perfumes and other products. A mouthwash, introduced in 1908, was given the brandname Läkerol, a year later given to a pastille, which is still sold internationally in several variants. 

The company was in 1993 later bought by the Finnish company Huhtamäki which quickly terminated the brand Ahlgrens and rebranded all its products to Leaf except for Ahlgrens bilar.

The product still most closely associated with the brand is 'Ahlgrens bilar' ("Ahlgren's Cars"), sold since 1953 and marketed as "the world's most sold car" (which is possibly technically correct, by number of cars). The small marshmallow cars are so popular within Sweden that stores that specifically cater to Swedish tourists and residents in other countries have started selling them as well.

The brand has been extended to other car- and road-related products, liquorice car tyres, travel trailers and sour road signs, the latter including the elk warning signs beloved by German tourists.

External links
Ahlgrens bilar (in Swedish, Danish and Norwegian)

Defunct food and drink companies of Sweden 
Defunct food and drink companies of Finland
Brand name confectionery
1885 establishments in Sweden
Companies based in Gävleborg County
1993 disestablishments in Finland
Food and drink companies disestablished in 1993